The Guerrier was a Magnifique class 74-gun ship of the line of the French Navy.

She took part in the Battle of Minorca (1756) and in the Battle of Lagos. She was part of Bougainville's squadron for the Naval operations in the American Revolutionary War, and took part in the operations before the Battle of Rhode Island, in the Battle of Grenada, and in the siege of Savannah.

In July 1781, she took part in the Invasion of Minorca. On 9 August, she captured the 700-tonne HMS Scarborough.

By the time of the invasion of Egypt, Guerrier should have been decommissioned for two years, but was nevertheless incorporated in the invasion fleet. She took part in the Battle of the Nile, where she was captured by the British. She was so badly damaged that she was burnt.

See also
List of ships captured in the 19th century

Sources and references
Citations

Sources

Ships of the line of the French Navy
Magnifique-class ships of the line
1753 ships
Captured ships
Maritime incidents in 1798
Ships built in France
Ship fires
Scuttled vessels
Shipwrecks of Egypt
Shipwrecks in the Mediterranean Sea